Bin-Houyé is a town in the far west of Ivory Coast. It is a sub-prefecture and commune of Zouan-Hounien Department in Tonkpi Region, Montagnes District. A border crossing with Liberia is three kilometres to the northwest.

In 2014, the population of the sub-prefecture of Bin-Houyé was 28,499.

Villages
The twenty two villages of the sub-prefecture of Bin-Houyé and their population in 2014 are:

Notes

Sub-prefectures of Tonkpi
Ivory Coast–Liberia border crossings
Communes of Tonkpi